Torell Troup (born June 23, 1988) is a former American football defensive tackle. Troup was drafted by the Buffalo Bills in the second round of the 2010 NFL Draft. He played college football at UCF.

High school career 
Troup attended Salem High School in Conyers, Georgia, where he was a two-time first-team all-state performer as a junior and senior. He finished his senior season with 96 total tackles (50 solo stops), six tackles for loss, and three quarterback sacks.

Considered a two-star recruit by Rivals.com, Troup was not listed among the top defensive tackle prospects in 2006. He chose Central Florida over Minnesota, Maryland, and Ole Miss.

College career 
As a true freshman at the University of Central Florida, Troup saw action in nine games, including three starts at defensive tackle. By his sophomore season he had established himself as a key part of the rotation and started 11 of 14 games on the defensive line.

In his junior season, Troup earned All-Conference USA Second Team honors, after starting all 12 games and logging 52 tackles, 12.5 tackles for a loss (2nd on the team), and two sacks. A team captain in his senior year, he started all 13 games and helped the Knights lead Conference USA in rushing defense for the second consecutive season and post C-USA's top total defense.

Professional career

Buffalo Bills
Troup was selected by the Buffalo Bills in the second round (41st overall) of the 2010 NFL Draft. Troup was placed on injured reserve on August 23, 2012. He was released by the Buffalo Bills on August 31, 2013.

Oakland Raiders
Troup was signed by the Oakland Raiders as a reserve/future free agent on January 2, 2014. The Raiders released Troup on August 24, 2014.

Personal 
Troup is the son of Tory Troup and Lashana Johnson-Troup. He played under the name Torell Johnson during his high school career and his first two seasons at Central Florida.

References

External links 
Buffalo Bills bio
UCF Knights bio

1987 births
Living people
People from Conyers, Georgia
Sportspeople from the Atlanta metropolitan area
Players of American football from Georgia (U.S. state)
American football defensive tackles
UCF Knights football players
Buffalo Bills players
Oakland Raiders players